is a 2013 NTV Japanese television drama, starring Ryoko Yonekura and Junpei Mizobata. It aired from 13 April 2013 to 22 June 2013 with a total of 11 episodes.

Synopsis
The drama centers around how a 35 year old changes the school and influences her classmates’ lives while dealing with the dark reality of today’s high schools, including bullying and skipping school.

Plot
During the new semester in April, a woman suddenly appeared at Kunikida High. She was to be a new student in a class for 3rd year high school students. The other students in the class wondered who she truly was, and what her true intention for going back to school at 35 years old was. She did what ordinary high school students were expected to do, i.e. wearing school uniform and doing homework. However, she was clearly different. She went to school in an expensive car. During break time, she smoked with a teacher. After school, she drank beer. No one knows what she was up to, but they know, she was able to change people. She questioned the system and fought to change it. She tried to solve the problems faced by high school students, for example, bullying. She helped her classmates and befriended them, whilst trying to survive high school and put her tragic past behind her. Nevertheless, there is no secret that can be kept forever, and eventually the truth had to be let out... even if that meant having to confront her past.

Cast

Main Cast
Ryoko Yonekura as Ayako Baba
Mayu Matsuoka as young Ayako
Junpei Mizobata as Junichi Koizumi

Faculty Members
Tetsuya Watari as Yukinobu Asada
Nana Katase as Akiri Nagamine
Takeshi Masu as Makio Ninagawa
Toshihide Tonesaku as Takashi Saruwatari
Hiroki Aiba as Ryuichiro Kitajima
Yohei Kumabe as Wataru Iseya
Sho Ikushima as Koichi Higuchi
Megumi Yokoyama as Yuki Mayuzumi
Takaaki Enoki as Yoshio Noda

Class 3-A

Taiko Katono as Ryota Otake
Shiori Kitayama as Yuna Izumi
Fujiko Kojima as Moe Kokubun
Yua Shinkawa as Mitsuki Kudo
Masaki Suda as Masamitsu Tsuchiya
Mahiro Takasugi as Ren Higashi
Yukito Nishii as Teppei Saegusa
Shuhei Nomura as Osamu Yukawa
Alice Hirose as Rina Hasegawa
Reiko Fujiwara as Mai Yuki
Elina Mizuno as Ai Yamashita
Karen Miyazaki as Rikako Hatori
Aoi Morikawa as Hitomi Eto
Kento Yamazaki as Ryo Akutsu
Masami Imai as Rin Sato
Haruna Onishi as Momoko Ueda
Takumi Sato as Yuta Shimizu
Tomoya Shiba as Hitoshi Okura
Yoshiro Dojun as Tetsuya Jinbo
Kazuya Nakajima as Shinichi Kashiwagi
Tatsuya Nakayama as Yuji Matsumoto
Sumire Fujishiro as Keiko Hirakawa
Koki Horikoshi as Goki Murata
Daiki Mihara as Yosuke Shinohara
Izumi Yabe as Yui Matsushita
Mari Yamachi as Sayuri Tachibana

Guest Cast
Marika Tanaka (episode 1)
Hajime Yamazaki as Rina Hasegawa’s father (episode 1)
Yorie Yamashita as Rina Hasegawa’s mother (episode 1)
Kentaro Shimazu as a high school teacher (episode 1)
Junichi Kikawa as a news reporter (episode 1)
Marie Ueda as a news reporter (episode 1)
Takashi Ukaji as Ai Yamashita's father (episode 2)
Hajime Okayama as a police Officer (episode 2)
Keiko Shinohe as the woman Ai tries to steal from (episode 2)
Hisako Matsuyama as a parent (episode 2)
Masaya Seto as a parent (episode 2)
Yoshiko Minami as a parent (episode 2)
Takaya Sakoda (episode 2)
Shoji Kamata (episode 2)

Production Credits
Screenwriters: Yamaura Masahiro, Takahashi Yuya
Chief Producer: Ohira Futoshi
Producers: Ikeda Kenji, Akimoto Takayuki, Taka Aki
Directors:Sakuma Noriyoshi, Nagumo Seiichi, Nishino Maki
Music: Yokoyama Masaru

Episode Ratings

References

External links 

 Official Website 
 

Japanese drama television series
2013 Japanese television series debuts
2013 Japanese television series endings
Television series about bullying